Manohara Durbar was a seven-storied Rana palace in Manohara, Kathmandu, the capital of the Nepal. The palace complex was located 12 km southeast of the core of Kathmandu. It included a vast array of courtyards, gardens and buildings.

History

Manohara Durbar was built in 1879 by Jung Bahadur Rana's son, Commanding General Jagat Jung Rana, as his private residence. After the murder of Jagat Jung in 1886, Manohara Durbar was used as a prison for royal women from both the Rana and Shah families found guilty of adultery.

Current status
Even after the fall of the Rana regime, the ruins of Manohara palace could be seen until the late 1950s, but today the only remaining element from 1879 is a large pine tree.

See also
Babarmahal Revisited
Thapathali Durbar
Garden of Dreams
Rana palaces of Nepal

References

Palaces in Kathmandu
Rana palaces of Nepal
Former palaces in Nepal